Flavia Schwarz (born 7 November 1986) is a Swiss former football midfielder who played for FC Zürich and FFC Zuchwil 05 in the Nationalliga A. She currently serves as FC Zürich second team's assistant coach.

She was a member of the Swiss national team, and previously she played the 2005 U-19 Euro and the 2006 U-20 World Cup.

References

1986 births
Living people
Swiss women's footballers
Swiss Women's Super League players
FC Zürich Frauen players
Women's association football midfielders
Footballers from Zürich

FFC Zuchwil 05 players